Fatwa is a 2018 Tunisian drama film directed by Mahmoud Ben Mahmoud and co-produced by Habib Ben Hedi, Jean-Pierre Dardenne, and Luc Dardenne. The film stars Ahmed Hafiane with Ghalia Benali, Sarra Hannachi, Jamel Madani, and Mohamed Maghlaoui in supporting roles. The film revolves around Brahim Nadhour, a man who returns to Tunis from France and finally discovers his son Marouane was working for a radical Islamic group before his death.

The film premiered at the 2018 Carthage Film Festival. The film received mixed reviews from critics and screened in many Arab countries as well as other western countries. In 2018 at the Cairo International Film Festival, the film won two awards: Arab Cinema's Horizons Award for the Prix Saad Eldin Wahba pour le meilleur film and Best Arabic Film. In the same year, the film won two awards at the Carthage Film Festival: Best Actor in a Fiction feature film and Tanit d'Or for the Best Narrative Feature Film. Then in 2019, the film was nominated at the Malmö Arab Film Festival for the Jury Award for the Best Feature Film.

Cast
 Ahmed Hafiane as Brahim Nadhour
 Ghalia Benali as Loubna
 Sarra Hannachi as Marouane		
 Jamel Madani		
 Mohamed Maghlaoui

References

External links 
 

Tunisian drama films
2018 films
2018 drama films
Belgian drama films
French drama films
2010s French films